Heteromigas is a genus of spiders in the family Migidae. It was first described in 1902 by Hogg. , it contains 2 Australian species.

References

Migidae
Mygalomorphae genera
Spiders of Australia